Tej Sapru (born 5 January 1955) is an Indian actor. He is the son of D. K. Sapru and Hemvati, both of whom were actors in the Hindi film industry. He has appeared in a number of Bollywood films of between the 1980s and 2010s, including Gupt, Mohra, Sirf Tum  and Saajan. He is also known for his roles in popular television series such as Qubool Hai, Saat Phere, Yahan Main Ghar Ghar Kheli and The Zee Horror Show.

Tej's sisters, the actress Priti Sapru and the screenwriter Reema Rakesh Nath, are well-known names in Punjabi and Hindi cinema.

Filmography

Television career
Sapru has acted in several daily soaps like Qubool Hai, Saat Phere, Tumhari Pakhi, Yahaaan Main Ghar Ghar Kheli and Palampur Express. He is known for his portrayal of Amatya Rakshas in the Dangal TV/Imagine TV historical series Chandragupta Maurya, which depicts the life of Indian emperor Chandragupta Maurya. He also played the role of Greek king Seleucus I Nicator in the Colors TV serial Chakravartin Ashoka Samrat. and the role of Chanakya in ABP News TV series Bharatvarsh in 2016. He also portrayed as Md. Ali jinnah in the television series - Pradhanmantri.

TV serials

Web series

See also

List of Indian film actors
Bollywood

References

Living people
20th-century Indian male actors
Indian people of Kashmiri descent
Kashmiri Pandits
Indian male film actors
Indian male television actors
Place of birth missing (living people)
21st-century Indian male actors
Male actors in Hindi cinema
1955 births